Rzeczpospolita Polska was the official magazine of the Government Delegation for Poland (highest authority of the Polish Underground State). It was a source of instruction and information for other Polish underground organizations, including other underground publications, operating in occupied Poland.

First issue of Rzeczpospolita Polska was published on 15 March 1941, and last in July 1945, at the time that the Council of National Unity and the Government Delegation had disbanded. The circulation of the magazine varied from about 3,500 to 16,000 copies. Over its five years of existence, 80 issues were published. It was published biweekly. It was published in Warsaw, and after the fall of the Warsaw Uprising (when for a brief period it was published as a daily), in Kraków.

The first issue had twenty pages and the following articles: Independent Rzeczpospolita exits and fights, Belief in the victory, Treuga Dei in Poland, Cynicism, provocation and crime, and regular columns on Polish issues abroad, Foreign chronicle, and On the lands of Rzeczpospolita.

The magazine was divided into six sections:
 first: official declarations, statements and communications from the Delegate
 second: articles representing views of the Delegature
 third: materials on the activities of the Polish government-in-exile, and on the Polish Forces in the West
 fourth: international news, and the progress of the war
 fifth: reports on the goings on in the territories annexed by Nazi Germany and in the territories annexed by the Soviet Union); later this would be expanded to dedicated supplements
 sixth: overview of other interesting underground articles

Chief editor was Stanisław Kauzik, replaced by Franciszek Głowiński ("Tadeusz Bronicz", "Czołowski"). Głowiński was arrested on 2 February 1944, and replaced by Teofil Syga ("Cedro", "Grudzień"). Other members of the editorial board included Tadeusz Kolski, Witold Żarski, Stefan Krzywoszewski, Marian Grzegorczyk, Zbigniew Kunicki and Jan Mosiński, and Witold Giełżyński, Marian Grzegorczyk, Tadeusz Kobylański, Kazimierz Koźniewski, Stefan Krzywoszewski as well as Zbigniew Kunicki. The magazine was supported by writers such as Andrzej Tretiak, Wacław Borowy and Zygmunt Wojciechowski.

References

1941 establishments in Poland
1945 disestablishments in Poland
Biweekly magazines
Defunct magazines published in Poland
Magazines established in 1941
Magazines disestablished in 1945
Mass media in Kraków
Magazines published in Warsaw
Magazines published in Poland
Polish-language magazines
Polish underground press in World War II
Polish Underground State